Sefidar-e Markazi (also Romanized as Sefīdār-e Markazī; also known as Sefīdār and Sepīdār) is a village in Sepidar Rural District, in the Central District of Boyer-Ahmad County, Kohgiluyeh and Boyer-Ahmad Province, Iran. At the 2006 census, its population was 1,912, in 367 families.

References 

Populated places in Boyer-Ahmad County